Sheffield Live! is a community radio and local TV station originally established in 2003 as an independent company by the Community Media Association and is based in the city centre of Sheffield, England.

History
Sheffield Live! started operating a live streaming service on an annual Restricted Service Licence in 2000 and from 2002 was broadcasting regularly for four days a week on the Internet.

Station owner Commedia Sheffield first applied for a Community Broadcasting Licence in November 2004.

The service started broadcasting on the frequency 93.2 FM on 29 October 2007 with the studio based at 6 Paternoster Row, Sheffield in the former National Centre for Popular Music. Prior to this, the last time a new radio service launched in Sheffield was Hallam FM in October 1974. The station was launched to provide original programming by local people of all ages, backgrounds and abilities and was originally planned to broadcast for a minimum term of five years dependent on its success in the community.

Full-time over the air broadcasting started at 7 am with The Breakfast Show presented by Lloyd Samuels and Charles Clarke featuring interviews with Nick Clegg MP, local choral group Sosa Xa! and organisers of the three-day Dignity Not Detention march from Sheffield to Doncaster that took place on the same weekend.

Sheffield Live! uses a transmitter at Crosspool shared by other local radio stations provided by Bauer Radio and the BBC, allowing coverage as far as Rotherham, Doncaster, Barnsley and Chesterfield.

The station currently broadcasts from studios located at 15 Paternoster Row in central Sheffield above the Showroom Cinema accommodated in offices and training suites owned by Commedia Sheffield.

Projects and activities 

Sheffield Live! has been involved with many projects in the local community:
 Sheffield Live! helps organise events throughout the Sheffield area; for example, it has worked in partnership with Biggafish, a youth organisation based in London devoted to the education of young people through music.
 Sheffield Live! creates education, employment and training opportunities in the local area. For example, in 2009 the station ran a media training course, called "future:proof", designed to give unemployed adults the skills they need to succeed in a career in media.
 Sheffield Live! advertises and promotes local businesses, organisations and events for a low price. It also actively promotes itself, through its social networking sites and promotional days.

Relocation 
In 2009, the station relocated from the Hallam University owned buildings to a private office across the road at The Workstation above the Showroom Cinema.

Television 
Sheffield Live! began broadcasting on Tuesday 23 September 2014 at 6pm and broadcasts every night from 6pm to 1am.

Sheffield Live!'s television output includes Sheffield Live! News, Sheffield Live! Mix, Talking Sheffield, What's On, Walks Around Britain, Grassroots, Sharks Basketball, Sateen Daqiqi be al Arabi, Nice Out Innit?, The Bassment, After the Bell, Sabrang, Da Beat Down, Up North and The Who What Where Show.

Radio scheduled programmes 
Sheffield Live! has a host of local Radio programmes which include:

Communities Live 

Sheffield Live!'s flagship local issues programme Communities Live broadcast weekdays 12 pm.

The programme is produced and presented by different groups of volunteers each day, contents of the show include local and national politics, music, arts, and community events from Sheffield. The programme also encourages listeners to contact the show with ideas.

Spirit of the Wapentake 
Spirit of the Wapentake is a rock music show, broadcast live on Wednesday from 5 pm. The programme plays rock music from the past 40 years, it also includes news and local rock gigs information.

The Local Talent Show
The Local Talent Show broadcast every Friday from 4 pm, features up artists, and bands from Sheffield and local area, featuring a variety of music, interviews and acoustic performances.

Vancouver Manoeuver 
Vancouver Manoeuver presented by Lee Price features music from the West Coast of Canada.

The Live Science Radio Show 
The Live Science Radio Show is broadcast on Saturdays at 11am. Features science news, guests, information on local science events and discussions regarding various areas of science.

See also 
Community radio in the United Kingdom
Sheffield
List of television stations in the United Kingdom
Local television in the United Kingdom

Notes

References

External links 
 

2014 establishments in England
Community radio stations in the United Kingdom
Radio stations in Yorkshire
Mass media in Sheffield
Media cooperatives
Local television channels in the United Kingdom
Television channels and stations established in 2014
Co-operatives in the United Kingdom